Survival Pop is the second full-length album by Worriers. It has an accompanying zine. Originally released by SideOneDummy Records in 2017, the album was reissued with two extra songs by 6131 Records upon their signing the band in late 2018.

Track listing
All songs written by Lauren Denitzio and Worriers.

 My 85th Rodeo – 02:43
 Not Your Type – 03:08
 The Possibility – 03:06
 Gaslighter – 02:08
 No More Bad News - 03:46†  
 What We're Up Against – 03:19
 Future Me – 03:08
 The Saddest Little Waffle House in Eastern Pennsylvania - 02:54† 
 Self Esteemed – 02:42
 No Thanks – 02:19
 Glutton (Reprise) – 02:52
 WTF Is Sleep? – 02:50
 Best Fear / Worst Fantasy – 02:35
 Open Heart – 03:15

† Only on the 6131 Records 2018 reissue.

Personnel 
 Lauren Denitzio – guitar, vocals
 Lou Hanman – guitar, vocals
 Mikey Erg – drums, vocals
 Nick Psillas – bass
 John McLean – guitar

References

2017 albums
Worriers (band) albums
SideOneDummy Records albums